Ville Räikkönen (born 14 February 1972 in Tuusula) is a Finnish former biathlete. He is the second cousin of 2007 Formula One World Champion Kimi Räikkönen.

Career 
Olympics
1998 - bronze medal on the sprint

References
IBU Profile

1972 births
Living people
People from Tuusula
Finnish male biathletes
Olympic biathletes of Finland
Biathletes at the 1998 Winter Olympics
Biathletes at the 2002 Winter Olympics
Olympic bronze medalists for Finland
Olympic medalists in biathlon
Medalists at the 1998 Winter Olympics
Sportspeople from Uusimaa